Zerogram Press is dedicated to publishing contemporary literary fiction written in English. It also publishes literary criticism and essays.

It was founded in 2016.

Books

 Novel Explosives by Jim Gauer (2016)
 My Back Pages: Reviews and Essays by Steven Moore (2017)
 Alexander Theroux: A Fan's Notes by Steven Moore (2020)
 Panthers and the Museum of Fire by Jen Craig (2020)
 See What I See: Essays by Greg Gerke (2021)
 Hang Him When He Is Not There by Nicholas John Turner (2021)
 Doom Town by Gabriel Blackwell (2022)
 A World with No Shore by Hélène Gaudy, Translated from the French by Stephanie Smee (2022)
 American Stutter: 2019–2021 by Steve Erickson (2022)
 The Manifold Destiny of Eddie Vegas Rick Harsch (2022)

References

External links
 Zerogram Press website

Book publishing companies based in California
Companies based in Los Angeles